Almașu is a commune in Sălaj County.

Almașu may also refer to:

Almașu Mare, a commune in Alba County
Almașu Mic (disambiguation), several places
 Almașu Sec, a village in Cârjiți Commune, Hunedoara County

See also 
 Almaș (disambiguation)